Silvano Basagni (6 August 1938 – 10 May 2017) was an Italian sport shooter. He competed in the mixed trap at the 1972, 1976 and 1980 Olympics and won a bronze medal in 1972. Basagni died on 10 May 2017 in Firenze, Italy. He was 78.

References

1938 births
2017 deaths
Italian male sport shooters
Trap and double trap shooters
Olympic shooters of Italy
Shooters at the 1972 Summer Olympics
Shooters at the 1976 Summer Olympics
Shooters at the 1980 Summer Olympics
Olympic bronze medalists for Italy
Olympic medalists in shooting
Medalists at the 1972 Summer Olympics
20th-century Italian people
21st-century Italian people